Esfaderan (also Romanized as Esfaderān and Esfadrān; also known as Esfandarān and Isfardeh) is a village in Ramjerd-e Yek Rural District, in the Central District of Marvdasht County, Fars Province, Iran. At the 2006 census, its population was 699, in 161 families.

References 

Populated places in Marvdasht County